Corey Damon Davis (born January 11, 1995) is an American football wide receiver for the New York Jets of the National Football League (NFL). He played college football at Western Michigan, where he became the NCAA Division I FBS leader in career receiving yards. He was drafted by the Tennessee Titans fifth overall in the 2017 NFL Draft.

Early years
The second youngest of seven siblings, Davis attended Wheaton Warrenville South High School in Wheaton, Illinois. As a sophomore, he was called up to varsity to play alongside his big brother Titus Davis, who went on to become the all-time leading receiver in touchdowns and yards from scrimmage for Central Michigan University. The duo were part of the Tigers 2010 perfect 14–0 Illinois Class 7A state championship team. As a senior, Corey finished the season 45 receptions and 6 receiving touchdowns. During his youth football years playing for the Wheaton Rams he forged a close friendship with the son of former Tampa Bay Buccaneers player Dan Graham. At the end of his junior year, he decided to move out of his family's 2-bedroom apartment and move in with the Graham family and they would later become Davis' legal guardians. Davis did not receive any scholarships until late in his senior year. Davis struggled in school throughout his first three years of high school. The Grahams hired a personal tutor for him so he could get his GPA high enough to be eligible to receive an NCAA scholarship. After graduation, Davis committed to Western Michigan University to play college football, which was his only Division I scholarship.

College career
As a true freshman at Western Michigan in 2013, Davis set school freshman records with 67 receptions for 941 yards and was named the Mid-American Conference (MAC) Freshman of the Year.

As a sophomore in 2014, Davis had 78 receptions for 1,408 yards and 15 touchdowns.

As a junior in 2015, Davis had 90 receptions for 1,436 yards and 12 touchdowns.

Against the Toledo Rockets on November 25, 2016, Davis became the all-time FBS leader in receiving yards, breaking the record previously held by Nevada's Trevor Insley. He was named conference Offensive Player of the Year as well as First-team All-MAC.

Davis majored in sports management.

Statistics

†NCAA Division 1 FBS all-time record

Professional career
Davis attended the NFL Scouting Combine, but was unable to participate in athletic drills due to an ankle injury. Davis reportedly scored 31 on the Wonderlic test. Despite an injury leaving Davis unable to perform pre-draft workouts, he was still considered a top wide receiver prospect eligible for the 2017 NFL Draft class.

Tennessee Titans
The Tennessee Titans selected Davis in the first round (fifth overall) of the 2017 NFL Draft. He is the highest draft selection from Western Michigan University.

2017 season
On July 29, 2017, the Titans signed Davis to a fully guaranteed four-year, $25.39 million contract that includes a signing bonus of $16.60 million. Davis made his NFL debut in the Titans' season-opening 26–16 loss to the Oakland Raiders and caught six receptions for 69 yards. Battling a hamstring injury for much of the season, Davis finished his rookie year with 34 receptions for 375 yards. On January 13, 2018, Davis caught his first two NFL touchdowns from Marcus Mariota in the 2017 AFC Divisional Round 35–14 loss to the New England Patriots. He finished the game with five receptions for 63 yards and the two aforementioned touchdowns.

2018 season
During Week 4 against the Philadelphia Eagles, Davis had a career game with nine receptions for 161 yards, including the game-winning touchdown from Marcus Mariota in overtime. On November 11, Davis had another great outing against the New England Patriots, catching seven passes for 125 yards and a touchdown as the Titans won by a score of 34–10. Two weeks later in a 34–17 road loss to the Houston Texans, he had one rush for 39 yards and caught four passes for 96 yards and a touchdown. In the next game against the New York Jets, Davis rushed once for 12 yards and caught three passes for 42 yards including the game-winning touchdown with less than a minute remaining.

Davis finished his second professional season with 891 receiving yards, four receiving touchdowns, and 55 rushing yards in 16 games and starts. He led the Titans in receptions, receiving yards, and touchdowns.

2019 season

During Week 4 against the Atlanta Falcons, Davis caught five passes for 91 yards and his first receiving touchdown of the season in the 24–10 road victory. Three weeks later against the Los Angeles Chargers, Davis caught his second touchdown of the season as the Titans won by a score of 23–20. He did not play in Week 10 against the Kansas City Chiefs due to a hip injury. Davis finished his third season with 43 receptions for 601 yards and two touchdowns in 15 games and 11 starts. In the Divisional Round of the playoffs against the Baltimore Ravens, he caught a three-yard touchdown pass from running back Derrick Henry in the 28–12 road victory.

2020 season
On May 1, 2020, the Titans declined the fifth-year option on Davis' contract, making him a free agent in 2021. He was placed on the team's active/physically unable to perform list at the start of training camp on July 28, 2020. He was activated on August 17, 2020, after passing a physical.

In the 2020 regular season opener for the Titans, Davis had seven receptions for 101 receiving yards in the 16–14 victory over the Denver Broncos on Monday Night Football. He was placed on the reserve/COVID-19 list by the team on October 7, and activated on October 19.  In Week 8 against the Cincinnati Bengals, he had eight receptions for 128 yards and a touchdown in the 31–20 loss. During Week 10 against the Indianapolis Colts, Davis elected to play a day after the death of his older brother to cancer, recording five catches for 67 yards.
In Week 11 against the Baltimore Ravens, Davis recorded five catches for 113 yards during the 30–24 overtime win. In Week 13 against the Cleveland Browns, Davis caught eleven passes for 182 yards, both career highs, along with a touchdown reception in the 41–35 loss. 
In Week 15 against the Detroit Lions, Davis recorded four  catches for 110 yards, including a 75 yard touchdown reception, during the 46–25 win. Davis finished the 2020 season with 65 receptions for 984 receiving yards and five receiving touchdowns.

Following the season, Davis was ranked 91st by his fellow players on the NFL Top 100 Players of 2021.

New York Jets
On March 18, 2021, Davis signed with the New York Jets on a three-year, $37.5 million contract. He made his Jets debut in Week 1 against the Carolina Panthers, recording five catches for 97 yards and two touchdowns. He caught the first career touchdown pass of rookie Zach Wilson's career. In Week 4 against the Tennessee Titans he had four catches for 111 yards and a touchdown. In Week 7 against the New England Patriots, he caught Mike White's first career touchdown pass. On December 7, 2021, Davis was placed on injured reserve after undergoing core muscle surgery. He finished his first season with the Jets with 34 catches for 492 yards and four touchdowns through nine games.

NFL career statistics

Regular season

Postseason

See also
 List of NCAA Division I FBS career receiving yards leaders
 List of NCAA Division I FBS career receiving touchdowns leaders

References

External links

Western Michigan Broncos bio
New York Jets bio

1995 births
Living people
Sportspeople from Wheaton, Illinois
Players of American football from Chicago
American football wide receivers
Western Michigan Broncos football players
Tennessee Titans players
New York Jets players
All-American college football players